Long Time Coming is a studio album by Jonny Lang. It was recorded at MF Studio and The Attic, Monrovia, California, and released on October 14, 2003, when he was 22. The album had been a "long time coming," with five years passing since the release of Wander This World.

Lang incorporated more R&B influences into his overall musical style, without neglecting his love for the blues. The album has more rock-elements compared to his previous work, and features one ballad with beat and arrangement comparable to modern R&B/Pop ("Touch"). One of the songs is a cover of Edgar Winter's "Dying to Live." The album also features Aerosmith's Steven Tyler on "Happiness and Misery," where he plays the harmonica.

The album peaked at #17 on the Billboard 200 album chart.

Critical reception
AllMusic called the album "a major disappointment and setback for a once promising musician." Entertainment Weekly called it "slick, entirely unmemorable middle-of-the-road rock."

Track listing
All songs written by Jonny Lang and Marti Frederiksen except where indicated.

 "Give Me Up Again"
 "Red Light" (Anthony Hamilton, Neely Dinkins)
 "Get What You Give"
 "The One I Got"
 "Touch"
 "Beautiful One"
 "If We Try"
 "Goodbye Letter"
 "Save Yourself"
 "To Love Again"
 "Happiness and Misery"
 "Hide Your Love"
 "Dying to Live" (Edgar Winter)
 "Long Time Coming"
 "Livin' for the City (Bonus Live Track)" (Stevie Wonder)

Personnel

Jonny Lang (vocals, lead guitar)
Marti Frederiksen (rhythm guitar, bass, drums, percussion)
John Goux (guitar)
Jim Cox (piano, Wurlitzer piano, Hammond B-3 organ)
Scott Gordon (Wurlitzer piano, programming)
Bruce McCabe (clavinet)
Joey Waronker (drums)
Lenny Castro (congas)
Kayla Parker (background vocals)
Steven Tyler & Anthony Hamilton (guests)

References

2003 albums
Jonny Lang albums